Diarmuid Noyes (born 14 January 1988) is an Irish theatre, TV, commercial and film actor, known for his role in the 2011 American science fiction horror telefilm, Roadkill. At fourteen he starred in the 2002 award-winning Irish short film, Broken Things. He plays Alessandro Farnese (the eventual Paul III) in the Tom Fontana television series, Borgia.

Filmography

Television
 Blood (2018–2020) – Michael Hogan
Borgia (2011) – Alessandro Farnese
Single-Handed (2010) – Ruairi
Pure Mule: The Last Weekend (2009) – Dean
The Tudors (2009) – Charlie Raw
Prosperity (2007) – Dean
Fair City - Teenager

Movies
Two Black Coffees (2017)Honeymoon for One (2011) – MarkDownriver (2011) – EricRoadkill (2011) – ChuckKilling Bono (2011) – PluggerParked (2010) – Cathal's brotherSavage (2009) – Attacker 2Five Minutes of Heaven (2009) – AndySituations Vacant (2008) – DaveBroken Things'' (2002) – Joey

External links

Male actors from Dublin (city)
Living people
1988 births
Irish male stage actors
Irish male film actors
Irish male television actors